First United Methodist Church, also known as Chester Hill ME Church, is a historic United Methodist church at 227 E. Lincoln Avenue in Mount Vernon, Westchester County, New York, United States.  It was built in 1900-1901 and is a Romanesque Revival style building.  It is constructed of granite with limestone details and a red slate roof. It features an 85-foot bell and clock tower and multi-gabled roof.  The interior features a semi-circular, amphitheater-like seating plan in the Akron Plan.

It was a work of architect George W. Kramer.

It was added to the National Register of Historic Places in 2000.

See also
National Register of Historic Places listings in southern Westchester County, New York

References

United Methodist churches in New York (state)
Churches on the National Register of Historic Places in New York (state)
National Register of Historic Places in Westchester County, New York
Romanesque Revival church buildings in New York (state)
Churches completed in 1890
19th-century Methodist church buildings in the United States
Churches in Westchester County, New York
Akron Plan church buildings